Setting the Paces was the third full-length album by indie rock band BOAT, released in 2009.

Reception

Setting the Paces received largely positive reviews from critics.  Allmusic's Tim Sendra describes the album as having "debts owed to Pavement, Television Personalities, and the Banana Splits, and with a bouncy energy that makes the album very easy to like."  Pitchfork Media's David Bevan claims the songs give "way to a full-blast power chord workout and on to a chuggable chorus... At the center of it all is one gooey, delicious hook... Every song is irrepressible in its own right."

Track listing

 "Friends Since 1989" – 2:31
 "Lately... (I've Been on My Back)" – 3:11
 "Tough Talking the Tulips" – 2:36
 "Interstate 5" – 1:53
 "100 Calorie Man" – 2:02
 "We Want It! We Want It!" – 3:25
 "The Name Tossers" – 3:55
 "Jeff Fell Dream" – 1:41
 "Prince of Tacoma" – 2:43
 "God Save the Man, Who Isn't All That Super" – 3:04
 "(Do the) Magic Centipede" – 2:07
 "Calcium Commuter" – 2:49
 "Reverie" – 2:34
 "You're Muscular" – 3:43

Personnel

 D. Crane, vocals and guitar
 M. McKenzie, bass and guitar
 J. Goodman, multi-instrumentalist, percussion
 J. Long, drums, producer 
 M. McKenzie, bass, guitar, vocals, bells
 R. Cancro, saxophone, vocals 

Recording

 Jackson Justice Long, producer, recording, mixing (5, 8, 9, 12, 13, 14)
 Cam Nicklaus, mixing, recording
 John McCaig, mastering

References 

2009 albums